Luzula lutea, is a species of perennial plant in Juncaceae family which is  tall. It has ovate bracteoles which are circa  in length.

References

lutea
Flora of Spain
Flora of the Pyrenees
Plants described in 1785